The CONCACAF Gold Cup is North America's major tournament in senior men's soccer and determines the continental champion. Until 1989, the tournament was known as CONCACAF Championship. It is currently held every two years. From 1996 to 2005, nations from other confederations have regularly joined the tournament as invitees. In earlier editions, the continental championship was held in different countries, but since the inception of the Gold Cup in 1991, the United States are constant hosts or co-hosts.

From 1973 to 1989, the tournament doubled as the confederation's World Cup qualification. CONCACAF's representative team at the FIFA Confederations Cup was decided by a play-off between the winners of the last two tournament editions in 2015 via the CONCACAF Cup, but was then discontinued along with the Confederations Cup.

From September 2018 to March 2019, Guyana played in a tournament to determine the ten teams to go to the 2019 CONCACAF Gold Cup and in the last matchday they qualified for the Gold Cup for the first time.  

In July 2021, Guyana lost against Guatemala for a spot in the 2021 CONCACAF Gold Cup.

Record at the CONCACAF Championship/Gold Cup

Match overview

Record by opponent

References

External links
RSSSF archives and results
Soccerway database

Countries at the CONCACAF Gold Cup
Guyana national football team